The Bolivian brushfinch or rufous-naped brushfinch (Atlapetes rufinucha) is a species of bird in the family Passerellidae.

It is endemic to Bolivia and is found in humid Andean forests.

It sometimes includes the rufous-naped brushfinch, Vilcabamba brushfinch and grey-eared brushfinches as subspecies.

References

Atlapetes
Birds of Bolivia
Endemic birds of Bolivia
Birds described in 1837
Taxonomy articles created by Polbot
Taxa named by Frédéric de Lafresnaye
Taxa named by Alcide d'Orbigny